Terry Keenan (June 1, 1961 – October 23, 2014) was an American economic/business columnist for the New York Post, and a former anchor for CNN. Keenan was host of the Fox News stocks/investment program Cashin' In from 2001 to 2009, and a senior business correspondent for Fox News and Fox Business. In September 2009 she became a Fox News contributor, in addition to being an economic/business columnist for the New York Post, which is owned by Fox parent company NewsCorp.

Early life
Born in Albany, New York, Keenan had two sisters. Her father, Joseph, worked at the University at Albany, SUNY as a professor in sociology and her mother Marie ran a young women's employment agency. She was educated at the Academy of the Holy Names and later earned an undergraduate degree in mathematics at Johns Hopkins University in 1983.

Career
After graduation, she was initially hired by PBS to work as a writer and producer before moving to CNN in 1986 and worked there in various capacities until 1995. Keenan worked behind the camera as a producer before moving into an on-air role. In 1995, she jumped to CNBC, where she anchored until returning to CNNfn in January 1998 after being unable to reach a mutual agreement on a new assignment. Upon her return, she became a senior correspondent for Moneyline and anchored Street Sweep. She joined Fox in 2002 where she was a business correspondent and also anchored the investment program Cashin' In. In September 2009 she became a Fox News contributor, in addition to being an economic/business columnist for the New York Post, which is owned by Fox parent company NewsCorp.

Personal life and death
Keenan married Ronald Kass, a vice-president of a manufacturer of home decorating/furnishing products, in 1994. They had a son, Benjamin. Keenan died suddenly on October 23, 2014 from a brain hemorrhage, at age 53.

References

External links
Terry Keenan and Ronald Kass wedding announcement

1961 births
2014 deaths
American economics writers
American investors
American columnists
American reporters and correspondents
CNBC people
CNN people
Fox News people
Fox Business people
Johns Hopkins University alumni
Journalists from New York City
Writers from Albany, New York
American women television journalists
American women columnists
21st-century American women